Copenhagen: Elements of Life World Tour is a DVD of Tiësto's Elements of Life World Tour November 10, 2007 performance at Parken Stadium in Copenhagen, Denmark. The DVD was released March 7, 2008.

It was released on DVD and Blu-ray. Both double disc versions cover over four hours of Tiësto's concert in Denmark; the additional footage such as an On The Road feature, music videos, and TV commercials.

The Blu-ray version is Region B encoded, which means it only works in Europe, Middle East, Africa, Australia, New Zealand. Consumers in other countries including North America will not be able to view the Blu-ray disc.

About 
The 2-disc pack covers more than four hours of Tiësto's Elements Of Life performance at the Parken Stadium in Copenhagen, along with the footage of the event the DVD also features an extras as well as Blu-ray high definition imaging release available in DTS audio.

Since Tiësto's Elements of Life World Tour concerts are supported by a large amount of modern electronic equipment, the venue for the DVD recording had to be large enough to handle the full scale of the show, this included lightning and an enormous screen where the elements were displayed. The Parken Stadium in Copenhagen, Denmark was an excellent location to shoot the footage for the DVD. With more than 25,000 people present, the atmosphere captured on video resulted in a fantastic impression of what the Elements of Life World Tour is about and alongside the movie, the DVD also features 2 MP3's of the soundtrack. Both DVD and CD feature a broad selection of classic Tiësto tracks like; Love Comes Again, Flight 643, Lethal Industry, Dance4Life, In The Dark and other special features including an "On The Road" footage, TV Commercials and Music Videos.

Video listing

Credits 

Disc 1: Tiësto Elements of Life
 "Tiësto - Ten Seconds Before Sunrise"
 Written-By, Composed By: Tiësto, D.J. Waakop Reijers-Fraaij
 "Deadmau5 - Not Exactly"
 Written-By, Composed By: Joel Zimmerman
 "Tiësto - Everything (Cosmic Gate Remix)"
 Featuring: Jes
 Remix: Cosmic Gate
 Written-By, Composed By: Tiësto, D.J. Waakop Reijers-Fraaij, Jes
 "Allure - Somewhere Inside"
 Featuring: Julie Thompson
 Composed By: D.J. Waakop Reijers-Fraaij, Julie Thompson, Tijs Verwest
 Written-By: Julie Thompson, Tijs Verwest
 "Tiësto - Carpe Noctum"
 Written-By, Composed By: Tiësto, D.J. Waakop Reijers-Fraaij
 "Unity Street - Say Ho!"
 Written-By, Composed By: Keepon, Retsiem
 "James Doman vs. Red Carpet - Alright"
 Written-By, Composed By: Patrick Bruyndonx, Raffaele Brescia
 "Imogen Heap - Hide And Seek (Tiësto's In Search of Sunrise Remix)"
 Remix: Tiësto
 Written-By, Performer, Producer: Imogen Heap
 "Soliquid - Music Is For Rich People (Mat Zo Remix)"
 Remix: Mat Zo
 "Tiësto - Bright Morningstar"
 Written-By, Composed By: BT, Tiësto
 "Miko - Muzaik (Marcus Schössow Remix)"
 Remix: Marcus Schössow
 Written-By, Composed By: Reda Benembarek
 "Pascal Feliz - From Inside The Speaker (Part 1)"
 Written-By, Composed By: Pascal van Boxtel
 "Starkillers - Killer"
 Written-By, Composed By: Tinley, Seal
 "Randy Boyer & Eric Tadla - Stemcell"
 Written-By, Composed By: Eric Tadla, Randy Boyer
 "Tiësto - Elements of Life"
 Written-By, Composed By: Tiësto, D.J. Waakop Reijers-Fraaij, Geert Huinink
 "Breakfast - The Horizon"
 Written-By, Composed By: Casey Keyworth
 "Oliver Smith - Nimbus"
 Written-By, Producer: Oliver Smith
 "Carl B. - Life Can Wait
 Written-By, Composed By: Carl Barrdahl
 "Steve Forte Rio - A New Dawn (Extended Version)
 Written-By, Composed By: Daniel Joaquin, Steve Forte Rio
 "Jedidja - Dancing Water"
 Written-By, Composed By: D.J. Waakop Reijers-Fraaij, Tijs Verwest
 "D'Alt Vila - Breathing"
 Written-By, Composed By: Eliano Daviti, Roberto Scilatti

Disc 2: The Sound of Tiësto
 "Tiësto - Dance4Life (Freedom Mix)"
 Composed By: Tiësto, D.J. Waakop Reijers-Fraaij
 Written-By, Featuring: Maxi Jazz
 "Tiësto - Traffic"
 Written-By, Composed By: Tiësto
 "Tegan & Sara - Back In Your Head (Tiësto Remix)"
 Remix: Tiësto
 Written-By, Composed By:Sara Quin, Tegan Quin
 "Tiësto - In The Dark"
 Featuring: Christian Burns
 Written-By, Composed By: Christian Burns, Tiësto
 "Tiësto - Sweet Things (Tom Cloud Remix)"
 Featuring: Charlotte Martin
 Remix: Tom Cloud
 Written-By, Composed By: BT, Charlotte Martin, Tiësto
 "Tiësto - Love Comes Again"
 Featuring: BT
 Written-By, Composed By: BT, Tiësto
 "Tiësto - Flight 643 (Richard Durand Remix)"
 Remix: Richard Durand
 Written-By, Composed By: Tiësto
 "Tiësto - Lethal Industry"
 Written-By, Composed By: Tiësto
 "Delerium - Silence (Tiësto's In Search of Sunrise Remix)"
 Featuring: Sarah McLachlan
 Remix, Producer [Additional] :Tiësto
 Written-By, Composed By: Bill Leeb, Rhys Fulber, Sarah McLachlan
 "Tiësto - Adagio For Strings"
 Producer, Arranged By: Tiësto
 Written-By, Composed By: Samuel Barber
 "Klaus Badelt - He's A Pirate (Tiësto Remix)"
 Music By: Geoffrey Zanelli, Hans Zimmer, Klaus Badelt
 Remix, Producer [Additional]: Tiësto
 "Bart Claessen - First Light (Original Dub Mix)"
 Composed By: Bart Claessen
 Written-By: Adrian Broekhuyse, Raz Nitzan
 "Cold Blue & Del Mar - 11 Days (Sebastian Brandt Remix)"
 Remix: Sebastian Brandt
 Written-By, Composed By - Pedro Del Mar, Tobias Shuh
 "Sean Tyas - Lift (Sean Tyas Rework)"
 Written-By, Composed By: Sean Tyas
 "First State - Sierra Nevada"
 Written-By, Composed By: Ralph Barendse, Sander van der Waal
 "Airbase - Medusa"
 Written-By, Producer: Jezper Söderlund
 "Simon Patterson - Bulldozer"
 Written-By, Producer: Dave Parkinson, Simon Patterson
 "Gareth Emery - More Than Anything (Stoneface & Terminal Remix)"
 Remix: Stoneface & Terminal
 Written-By: Gareth Emery, Roxanne Emery
 "Nenes & Pascal Feliz - Platinum"
 Written-By, Producer: Nenes, Pascal Feliz
 "Cass Fox - Touch Me (Mike Koglin vs. Jono Grant Remix)"
 Remix: Jono Grant, Mike Koglin
 Written-By, Composed By: Cass Fox, Rui Da Silva

Certifications

See also 
 Elements of Life World Tour
 Elements of Life
 Elements of Life: Remixed

References 

Tiësto video albums
2008 video albums
Live video albums
2008 live albums